Helena Tulve (born 28 April 1972) is an Estonian composer.

Born in Tartu, she studied composition at the Tallinn Secondary Music School under Alo Põldmäe and from 1989 to 1992 at the Estonian Academy of Music with Erkki-Sven Tüür, being the latter's sole student of composition thus far. In 1994 Tulve graduated with the Premier Prix from Jacques Charpentier's composition class at the Conservatoire Superieur de Paris. Between 1993 and 1996 she furthered her knowledge of Gregorian chant. She has also attended György Ligeti’s and Marco Stroppa’s summer courses.

Tulve belongs to the younger generation of Estonian composers who, in contrast to the neo-classicist tradition of rhythm-centeredness, create music which focuses on sound and sonority. Tulve’s works give a fair idea of the richness and variety of her cultural experience: the French school of spectral music, IRCAM’s experimentalism, Kaija Saariaho and Giacinto Scelsi, echoes of Gregorian chant and Eastern musics. Deriving from her refined sound processing, Tulve’s approach to form is “fluid” – more process based than architectonic.

Selected works
Reyah hadas ´ala for male voices and ancient music instruments (2005, text by Shalom Shabazi)
Lendajad for amplified flutes (2005)
[fl.in C (fl. picc./ fl. basso) & fl. in C (fl. picc./ fl. in G)]
ligne d´horizon for ensemble (2005)
[ 1-1-1-0/ 0-0-0-0/ pno-arpa-mandolino-guit.-1batt./ 1-1-1-1]
lumineux/opaque new version for clarinet, cello, piano and 3 wine glasses (2004)
chamber-opera It Is Getting So Dark (2003/04, text by Sei Shōnagon)
[14 female voices & ensemble: flauto-corno-vla-cb.-arpa-batt.]
...il neige for harpsichord and kannel (2004)
nec ros, nec pluvia... for string quartet (2004)
effleurements, éclatements... for guitar and percussion (2003)
abysses for flute and ensemble (2003)
[fl.picc./in C/alto/basso-fl.picc./in C/alto-ob.-fag.- tr.ne-batt.-v.la-vc. ]
lijnen for soprano and ensemble (2003)
[fl.-cl.-ob.-fag.-corno-vln.-vla- vc.-cb.]
delta soundscape for tape (2003)
Vie secrète for chamber choir (2002)
lumineux / opaque for violin, cello, piano and 3 wine glasses (2002)
Valvaja  for oboe solo (2002)
Cendres for ensemble (2001)
[fl.-cl.-vln.-vc.-cb.-2 batt.-2 pn.]
Traces for ensemble (2001
[fl.-ob.-cl.-sax.bar./sax.alto-batt.-vln.-cb.]
Vertige for piano (2000)
Ithaque for female voice, violin
and piano (2000)
Sula (Thawing) for orchestra (1999, commissioned by the NYYD Festival)
[3-3-3-3/ 4-3-3-0/ 5 batt./ 1 pn./ 1 arpa/ 16-14-12-10-8/ didgeridoo]
Passage secret for two clarinets (1999)
Sans titre for harpsichord (1999, commissioned by the NYYD Festival for Jukka Tiensuu)
Sinine (Blue) for chamber ensemble (1998, commissioned by the NYYD Ensemble)
[ 1-1-1-1/ 1-1-1-0/ 1 batt./ 1pn./ 1-1-1-1-1]
à travers for chamber ensemble (1998, commissioned by the NYYD Ensemble)
[ 1-1-1-1/ 1-0-1-0/ 1 batt./ 1-1-1-1-1]
Öö (Night) for saxophone quartet (1997, for Stockholm Saxophone Quartet, premiere at the NYYD Festival '97)
Sõnajalad (Ferns) for voice and piano with words by Karl Ristikivi (1994)
Saar (Island) for violin and clarinet (1993)
Exodus for chamber choir (1992/93)
Lethe for chamber ensemble (1991, fl., ob., cl., pn., vc.)
Phainomenon for piano, percussions and tape (1989/90)

Discography
 Lijnen (ECM Records, 2008)
 Arboles lloran por lluvia (ECM, 2014)
 Sula (Eesti Raadio, 2005)

References

External links
 

1972 births
Living people
People from Tartu
21st-century classical composers
Tallinn Music High School alumni
International Rostrum of Composers prize-winners
Women classical composers
Academic staff of the Estonian Academy of Music and Theatre
20th-century Estonian composers
21st-century Estonian composers
Recipients of the Order of the White Star, 5th Class
20th-century women composers
21st-century women composers